Tomás Aldazabal M. (born May 30, 1976 in Santa Fe) is a volleyball player from Cuba, who plays as a wing-spiker. He was a member of the Men's National Team that claimed the silver at the 2003 Pan American Games.

In this season (2009–2010) he plays in Portuguese team Sporting Clube de Espinho.

References
 FIVB Profile

1976 births
Living people
Cuban men's volleyball players
People from Isla de la Juventud
Volleyball players at the 2003 Pan American Games
Pan American Games silver medalists for Cuba
Pan American Games medalists in volleyball
Medalists at the 2003 Pan American Games